Liz Sarian is a French Armenian singer.

Biography
Sarian was born in a family of Armenian genocide survivors. She started to sing in childhood after she listened to Armenian songs sung by her mother. Some of Sarian's releases including "On s'aime" became bestsellers in Western Europe. She also took part at MIDEM 1967 in Cannes. 

Sarian's first concert in Yerevan took place in 1984 in Karen Demirchyan Complex. She is also known for joint concerts with Aida Garvarentz and Seda Aznavour. In 2009, they performed in Yerevan Opera Theater, and then in Gyumri and Stepanakert, in the context of "For You, Armenia" concert program, devoted to Charles Aznavour's 85th birth anniversary.

Discography

CD
1998 Live at Bobino
1998 Live in America
2010 Chansons arméniennes
2010 D'amour et d'Arménie

LP
1984 À Bobino
 Chansons Arméniennes

EP
1965 La tempête
1966 Dis-moi Mamie
1966 Pourtant je t'aimais
1967 La route qui mène au retour

External links
Liz Sarian at YouTube 
Liz Sarian sings with Aida and Seda Aznavours

References

French people of Armenian descent
French women singers
Ethnic Armenian women singers
Year of birth missing (living people)
Living people